Bahrain first competed at the Asian Games in 1974. Bahrain has won 84 medals at the games, including 37 golds. and the country will host a 19 Asian Games 2009 with 24 Arabian Gulf Cup and 3 more

Medal tables

Medals by Asian Games

Medals by Asian Winter Games

Medals by Asian Para Games

References